Bryotropha gemella is a moth of the family Gelechiidae. It is found in the north-eastern part of the United States and the adjoining south-eastern part of Canada.

The forewings are dark ochreous brown, suffused with pale ochre. The hindwings are fuscous grey to fuscous brown.

Etymology
The species name is derived from the adjective gemellus (meaning twin) and refers to the similarity to Bryotropha galbanella.

References

External links

 Wild species 2010: chapter 19 on Gov of Canada

Moths described in 2004
Moths of North America
gemella